Double simultaneous vote (DSV) is an electoral system in which multiple offices – such as the president and members of a legislature – are elected through a single vote cast for a party. It can be combined with other electoral systems; in Uruguay DSV is used to elect the president and members of the Senate and Chamber of Representatives, with the presidential election also using the two-round system; if no party/presidential candidate receives a majority of the vote, a second round is held for the presidential election.

The initial republican constitutions of several countries in the Commonwealth of Nations, such as Kenya, Guyana and Zambia, provided for presidential elections by double simultaneous vote. Occasionally, as in Tanganyika, a variant was used whereby the candidate who won a majority of constituencies (as opposed to a plurality of votes) would be elected.

Some Latin American countries used a DSV variant known as Ley de Lemas, in which parties may have sub-groups (sub-lemas) whose votes count towards the party's overall total.

Use

Notes

References

Electoral systems